Cruise is the fourteenth studio album by Japanese singer Akina Nakamori. It was released on 25 July 1989 under the Warner Pioneer label. The album includes lead single Liar. It was released after Nakamori's suicide attempt.

Background
Cruise is the final studio album released under label Warner Pioneer.

The album was recorded between 3 and 4 April 1989 in New York, at recording studio The Hit Factory. The album content is similar to her previously released studio album Crimson, which has only slow and medium melodies and singing with whisper voice (with the exception of Liar, which in the chorus part she used vibrato).

The title track Akai Fushigi was once used in the earlier published track list of the studio album Fushigi. It's unknown whenever the melody line is same or different during that time.

Aside of domestic music writers, several oversea writers were involved in the recording such as a Brazilian singer-songwriter Osny Mello or British songwriter Nicky Wood.

After the album release, Nakamori took one-year hiatus from her music activities and made her comeback in 1990 with single Dear Friend. Due to contract breach with recording label, Nakamori didn't release new studio album until 1993.

Promotion

Single
It consists only one previously released single, Liar. It includes renewed arrangement with the change of a few instrumental sections. The original version of Liar is included in the third Best compilation album series in 1992. It's Nakamori's first album in 4 years which includes at least one leading single, previous studio albums had only new recorded tracks.

Stage performances
In Fuji TV music television program Yoru no Hit Studio, Nakamori performed Liar twice between April and May. In TBS music television program The Best Ten, she performed Liar six times between May and June. In NTV music television program Top Ten she performed it five times between May and June. On 9 July, two days before suicide attempt, she performed it in music television reward program Megapolis Kayou Matsuri.

The single Liar was performed many times during her live performances between 1989 and 2003. For the first time, it was performed during special live East Live Index in April 1989, both live album and live DVD were released later. Ame ga Futteta, Ranka, Close your eyes, Singer and Liar were performed in Nakamori's live Yume 91 Akina Nakamori Special Live in 1991. In the live album Listen to me were recorded more tracks than in the DVD of live Yume 91 Akina Nakamori Special Live. Liar as only song was performed in special live Nakamori Akina True Live in 1995 and All About Akina 20th Anniversary It's Brand New Day in 2000. Rakka and Ame ga Futteta were performed in live tour Nakamori Akina 2000: 21 Seiki he no Tabidachi. Liar and Ranka were in the live tour I hope so in 2003.

Chart performance
The single Liar debuted at number 1 on the Oricon Single Weekly Chart and charted for 20 weeks. The single remained at number 28 on the Oricon Album Yearly Chart in 1989. The single debuted at number 2 on The Best Ten Weekly Chart and kept the same position for consecutive two weeks. The single debuted at number 2 on the Uta no Top Ten Weekly Chart.

The album reached at number 1 on the Oricon Album Weekly Chart and remained in the same position for the three weeks. The other released version debuted at number 1 as well. Vinyl Record version charted 15 weeks, Cassette tape charted 17 weeks and CD version charted 13 weeks. The album remained at number 31 on the Oricon Album Yearly Chart in 1989.

Track listing

Notes:
"Uragiri," "Liar," and "Singer" are stylised in all uppercase, whereas "Standing in Blue" is stylized in proper case.

References

1989 albums
Japanese-language albums
Akina Nakamori albums
Warner Music Japan albums